IV liga Świętokrzyskie group (grupa świętokrzyska) is one of the groups of IV liga, the 5th level of Polish football league system. 
The league was created in season 2000/2001 after introducing new administrative division of Poland. Until the end of the 2007/08 season IV liga lay at 4th tier of league system but this was changed with the formation of the Ekstraklasa as the top level league in Poland.
The clubs from the Świętokrzyskie Voivodeship compete in this group. The winner of the league is promoted to III liga group IV. The bottom teams are relegated to the group of Liga okręgowa from the Świętokrzyskie Voivodeship. This groups is Świętokrzyskie.

Season 2008/09 
IV liga became the 5th level of Polish football league system due to the formation of Ekstraklasa as the top level league in Poland.

References

Football_leagues_in_Poland
Świętokrzyskie_Voivodeship